Heterogeneous nuclear ribonucleoprotein A/B, also known as HNRNPAB, is a protein which in humans is encoded by the HNRNPAB gene. Although this gene is named HNRNPAB in reference to its first cloning as an RNA binding protein with similarity to HNRNP A and HNRNP B, it is not a member of the HNRNP A/B subfamily of HNRNPs, but groups together closely with HNRNPD/AUF1 and HNRNPDL.

Function 
This gene belongs to the subfamily of ubiquitously expressed heterogeneous nuclear ribonucleoproteins (hnRNPs). The hnRNPs are produced by RNA polymerase II and are components of the heterogeneous nuclear RNA (hnRNA) complexes. They are associated with pre-mRNAs in the nucleus and appear to influence pre-mRNA processing and other aspects of mRNA metabolism and transport. While all of the hnRNPs are present in the nucleus, some seem to shuttle between the nucleus and the cytoplasm. The hnRNP proteins have distinct nucleic acid binding properties. The protein encoded by this gene, which binds to one of the components of the multiprotein editosome complex, has two repeats of quasi-RRM (RNA recognition motif) domains that bind to RNAs. Two alternatively spliced transcript variants encoding different isoforms have been described for this gene.

Interactions 

HNRNPAB has been shown to interact with TP63.

References

Further reading